The Zeitschrift für die Neutestamentliche Wissenschaft und die Kunde der älteren Kirche (English: Journal for New Testament Studies and the Ancient Church) is a biannual peer-reviewed academic journal that was established in 1900. It is published by Walter de Gruyter. The focus of the journal is the historical investigation of early Christianity, especially on the New Testament and nascent Christianity through to the Patristic period. The current editor-in-chief is Michael Wolter. Articles are in German, English, or French.

A related journal from the same publisher is the Zeitschrift für die Alttestamentliche Wissenschaft.

See also 
 List of theological journals

External links 

 

Journals about ancient Christianity
New Testament theology
De Gruyter academic journals
Publications established in 1900
Multilingual journals
Biannual journals
Biblical studies journals